Rebecca Jane Miriam Goss is a professor of organic chemistry at the University of St. Andrews who won the 2006 Royal Society of Chemistry Meldola Medal. She is known for combining synthetic biology and chemistry for medicinal purposes.

Early life and education 
Goss completed her undergraduate studies in Chemistry at the University of Durham in 1997. Under the supervision of Prof. David O'Hagan, Goss completed her Ph.D. studying the biosynthesis of various natural products including the stereochemistry of enzymatic fluorination in fluoroacetate biosynthesis.

Research 
Goss specialises in the biosynthesis of natural products at the chemical and genetic level.

Goss joined the University of Cambridge in 2000 to study the chemistry and molecular biology of polyketide biosynthesis in the research group of Professors Jim Staunton (FRS) and Peter Leadlay (FRS). She held a one-year teaching fellowship at the School of Chemistry, University of Nottingham between 2002 and 2003 before obtaining a lectureship at the School of Biological and Chemical Science, University of Exeter in 2003. Between 2005 and 2010 Goss held a lectureship at the University of East Anglia before being promoted to senior lecturer in 2010 and then reader in organic chemistry in 2012. Goss moved to the University of St. Andrews in 2012 to become a reader in biomolecular and organic chemistry. In 2018 she became the first woman to be appointed professor of organic chemistry in St Andrews' 600-year history.

She was awarded the Royal Society of Chemistry Meldola prize for her work to understand the interface of organic chemistry and molecular biology. In 2013 she was awarded the Royal Society of Chemistry Natural Product Report Emerging Researcher Lectureship for her pioneering approach to 'Genochemetics', which combines synthetic biology and chemistry for medicinal purposes. In 2014 she was awarded an ERC consolidator grant.

Goss is on the advisory board for the peer-reviewed journals Chemical Communications and Natural Product Reports.

Awards 

 2013 Royal Society of Chemistry Natural Product Report Lectureship Award
 2011 UK's under 40 Organic Chemistry delegate for EuCheM’s Young Investigators Workshop
 2011 Thieme Chemistry Journal Award
 2006 Royal Society of Chemistry - Meldola prize

References

External links 

 

Living people
British women chemists
British chemists
Organic chemists
Year of birth missing (living people)
Place of birth missing (living people)
Academics of the University of St Andrews
Alumni of Hatfield College, Durham
Academics of the University of Nottingham
Academics of the University of Exeter
Academics of the University of East Anglia